Mowlana John Peter Miskin is a South Sudanese lawyer and politician. He has served as Minister of Legal Affairs of Western Bahr el Ghazal since 18 May 2010.

References

Year of birth missing (living people)
Place of birth missing (living people)
Living people
People from Western Bahr el Ghazal
South Sudanese lawyers
21st-century South Sudanese politicians